Tel Aviv, the Hebrew word for "Spring Mound" (where "spring" means the season), is the second largest city of Israel.

It may also refer to:
"Tel Aviv", an instrumental on Duran Duran (1981 album)
Tel Aviv District, a district of Israel
Tel Aviv Metropolitan Area, the largest metropolitan area in Israel
An alternative transcription of Tel Abib, a place mentioned in the Bible

Distinguish from
Telavi, the main city and administrative center of Georgia (Caucasus)'s eastern province of Kakheti

See also